Camaso is a surname. Notable people with the surname include:

Claudio Camaso (1939–1977), Italian actor
Don Camaso (born 1973), Filipino basketball player